Fernando Andrés Meneses Cornejo (born 27 September 1985) is a Chilean former footballer who played as a midfielder.

Football career
In 2004, he debuted in Colo-Colo. In those years, he also studied a technical-professional career in physical activity at the University of the Americas, where also was classmate of his teammates Claudio Bravo, Luis Mena and Miguel Riffo.

International career
He was a part of the 2005 FIFA World Youth Championship with Chile.  He wore jersey number seven.  Since then he has been called up to the adult squad for friendlies.

In May 2008, Meneses took part in the 2008 Toulon Tournament with Chile and played in all five games.

He was named in the preliminary squad for the 2015 Copa America but was omitted from the final squad.

In 2021, he played for Chilean Segunda División side Rodelindo Román.

International goals

Personal life
His son, Joaquín, is a youth footballer from the Universidad Católica youth ranks who has taken part of the Chile national youth teams.

Honours

Club
Colo-Colo
 Primera División de Chile (2):  2006 Apertura, 2006 Clausura

Universidad Católica
 Primera División de Chile (1): 2010
 Copa Chile (1): 2011

Veracruz
Copa MX: Clausura 2016

References

External links
 
 

1985 births
Living people
People from Curicó Province
Chilean footballers
Chile international footballers
Chile under-20 international footballers
Chilean expatriate footballers
Chilean Primera División players
Peruvian Primera División players
Liga MX players
Primera B de Chile players
Segunda División Profesional de Chile players
Colo-Colo footballers
O'Higgins F.C. footballers
Cobreloa footballers
Universidad de Concepción footballers
Club Deportivo Universidad Católica footballers
Club Alianza Lima footballers
C.D. Veracruz footballers
Unión Española footballers
Unión La Calera footballers
Deportes Melipilla footballers
Lautaro de Buin footballers
Rodelindo Román footballers
Chilean expatriate sportspeople in Peru
Expatriate footballers in Peru
Chilean expatriate sportspeople in Mexico
Expatriate footballers in Mexico
Association football midfielders
University of the Americas (Chile) alumni